Dirty Rotten Cheater was an American game show that was aired on PAX (now Ion Television). Bil Dwyer hosted the show and Craig DeSilva was the announcer. The TV program was produced by Jonathan Goodson and was aired thirteen episodes overall.

The show gameplay’s, originally called Cheaters in the 2002 pilot aired on NBC, combines elements of Weakest Link and Family Feud along with the BBC game format The Enemy Within, with a contestant being privy to answers in each round and trying to elude detection by fellow contestants and the studio audience.

Gameplay
At the start of each show, six contestants walk up to their podiums, open their monitor doors, and find out if they are the "Dirty Rotten Cheater". After each contestant's name is read, he faces the camera and other contestants and claims to not be the Cheater.

The game begins with a survey question, similar to those used on Family Feud (for example, "Which parts of their body do women think are too big?"). In the first four rounds, each player gives one answer; if the answer is on a list of the top ten responses given, the player receives an amount of money. Answers that appear lower on the list are worth more than those higher on the list. If the answer is not on the list, no money is given. The Cheater can see the entire top ten list of answers and may choose to either give a high-dollar answer to build their own bank, or a lesser answer in hopes of throwing off suspicion.

The ranking of the answers consisted of ten positions, and their values are:
 $250
 $500
 $750
 $1,000
 $1,250
 $1,500
 $1,750
 $2,000
 $2,250
 $2,500

At the end of each of the first three rounds, bonuses are awarded to the players who scored the most money in the round. The first place bonus is $10,000, second place is $7,500, and third place is $5,000. If there is a tie, the appropriate bonuses are combined and split between the tying players (i.e., if two players tie for first place, each receive $8,750).

The players are then given an opportunity to accuse one another of being the Cheater. After a few contestants have opined, they all secretly vote for whom they think is the Cheater using cards with the players' names on them. The players reveal their votes, starting at the left and moving right. The first contestant who receives three votes for that round is eliminated, losing all of his winnings, and must then truthfully state whether or not he’s the Cheater.

Depending on the outcome of the vote, one of three possible scenarios occurs:

If the eliminated contestant is the Cheater, he was eliminated from the game with no further participation, the remaining contestants keep all the money in their banks, and one of the remaining players is designated as the new Cheater in the same manner as in the beginning of the show.
If the eliminated contestant is not the Cheater, all the money that the contestants had earned up to that point is halved and the eliminated contestant is later given a chance to win money at the end of the show.
If no contestant receives three votes, all of the money the contestants earned up to that point is halved, and the Cheater is allowed to secretly eliminate an honest player. This is done by means of a button hidden inside the Cheater's podium (each podium has a button, but only the Cheater's button works). Everyone must reach inside their podium to keep the Cheater's identity a secret. One at a time, the host reads each contestant's name; when the name of the contestant is read that the Cheater wishes to eliminate, the Cheater presses his or her button. A red light flashes in the middle of the stage floor, and the selected contestant is eliminated; however, that contestant is likewise given an opportunity to win money at the end of the show.

Fourth round
In the fourth round, after the players have a chance to accuse the other players, the studio audience votes for whom they think is the Cheater. If a contestant receives at least 50 percent of the vote, he was eliminated. However, the remaining players do not lose any of their money. If no majority is met, the Cheater secretly eliminates an honest player as before.

Final round
In the Final Round, two questions are asked. For each question, the contestants alternate turns, giving three answers each. After both questions have been asked (and a total of 12 answers have been given), each player gets 15 seconds to convince the studio audience that he's not the Cheater. After each player has been given time to state his case, all eliminated honest players vote for whom they think is the Cheater. After they vote, the audience votes for whom they think is the Cheater.

The host reveals the identity of person who ultimately ended up as the Cheater, and the honest players who voted for that contestant as the Cheater win $500 each. Both remaining contestants are brought to center stage, each with a vault containing the amount of money in his bank. The Cheater walks forward to his vault, opens it, and reaches inside. If the majority of the audience correctly voted that player as the Cheater, his money immediately falls through a trap door in the container, and the honest player wins the money in his vault. If the majority of the audience voted for the honest contestant, the trap door is not activated and the Cheater wins his money, with the honest player receiving nothing.

In any case, the contestant winner did not take part in the next episode.

The maximum potential prize total is $63,500, attainable by giving the most valuable answer to every question in Rounds 1 through 4, earning the $10,000 bonus in Rounds 1 through 3, giving the three most valuable answers to both questions in Round 5, and losing no money in the voting.

International versions 
In the summer 2004, Dirty Rotten Cheater began airing six nights a week on Canale 5 in Italy; the Italian version was named L'imbroglione.

In Japan, the program was broadcasting as The Cheater (ザ・チーター) on TBS between October 2005 and August 2006. It was broadcast as a special program in May 2005, then as a late-night program between October 2005 and March 2006.

A short-lived version of the program also aired on France 2 (July 2006) as "Qui est le bluffeur?" ("Who is the bluffer?") with Belgian host Jean-Michel Zecca.

The UK version was hosted by Brian Conley. Originally this was to transmit in spring 2007, but eventually began on BBC One at 2.35pm on Monday 15 October. It was screened every weekday for three weeks, but was then replaced in the schedule by Diagnosis: Murder - the final five shows switched channels and were shown from Monday 12 November at 2.00pm on BBC Two. The UK version was taped at the Maidstone Studios in Kent, but edited at BBC Television Centre.

There are some format differences between the US and UK versions, the most obvious being that the UK version has one less contestant.

In Poland, ATM Grupa S.A. produced a Polish version of Dirty Rotten Cheater under name Gdzie jest Kłamczuch? (Where's the Liar?) (or simply Kłamczuch (Liar)). The show was transmitted on TV4 channel from September 4, 2008 to June 19, 2009. The program was hosted by Krzysztof Ibisz. The rules were similar to US version, and even used the US version's music in the first season. (The second season used an original but similar-sounding music package.)

In Vietnam, Đông Tây Promotion and HTV produced a Vietnamese version, "Tìm người bí ẩn" (Find the Hidden), aired weekly from August 8, 2006 to July 2007. The show was originally intended to be the Vietnamese version of The Weakest Link, but was switched due to copyright prices and because the mean format didn't suit Vietnamese culture. This version was hosted by singer and Merited Artist Tạ Minh Tâm (who also hosted the Vietnamese version of Family Feud, also produced by Đông Tây Promotion) and was sponsored by Trà Xanh Không Độ. Unlike other versions, all contestants, including the Cheaters, will receive prizes (if eliminated in the first four rounds they will receive 500,000 VNĐ (later 600,000 VNĐ) and a consolidation prize from Trà Xanh Không Độ, in the final round if one contestant loses the bank in the vault, he or she will leave with 1,000,000 VNĐ. The other contestant will receive the bank, but only a fixed prize of 3,500,000 VNĐ, no matter how much is in the bank.

Most of the European versions were distributed by Distraction Formats.

Versions have also aired in Hungary and Spain.

References

External links 
 

2000 American television series debuts
2000 American television series endings
2000s American game shows
English-language television shows